Welcome to Sweetie Pie's is an American reality television series starring the family of former Ikette Robbie Montgomery, and also focuses on the running of their collection of soul food restaurants, Sweetie Pie's. The series premiered on October 15, 2011, and ended on June 9, 2018, on the Oprah Winfrey Network.

Background

Robbie Montgomery began her career in the 1960s as an Ikette. The Ikettes was the backing group for soul duo sensation Ike & Tina Turner. After her lung collapsed and she could no longer sing, Robbie took her mother's soul food recipes, and created "Sweetie Pie's" St. Louis' soul food restaurant run by Miss Robbie and her family. With two locations, Miss Robbie is preparing to open a third restaurant with the help of her son and business partner, Tim. While Tim and his fiancée, Jenae, tend to their newborn son and plan their wedding – Miss Robbie, who has never been married, continues to look for love at the age of 71 all the while keeping the family in line – especially her nephew Lil' Charles. Welcome to Sweetie Pie's follows the Montgomery family as they struggle with the demands of expanding their family-owned business and creating a legacy to pass on to future generations.

Production
Welcome to Sweetie Pie's premiered on Oprah Winfrey Network on October 15, 2011. The series went on hiatus after the winter finale on December 3, 2011, and resumed with new episodes from March 31, 2012, until June 2, 2012. The first season consists of a total of 18 episodes. Beginning July 14, 2012, and continuing until the second season premiered, Oprah Winfrey Network aired two episodes of Welcome to Sweetie Pie's: An Extra Slice every Saturday, featuring never-before-seen moments from season 1. On April 5, 2012, OWN announced that Welcome to Sweetie Pie's was renewed for a second season.<ref>[https://tv.yahoo.com/news/own-says-oprah-continue-teach-master-class-unveils-173711929.html 'OWN Says Oprah Will Continue to Teach 'Master Class] Yahoo TV April 5, 2012</ref> Season 2 aired weekly on OWN September 15, 2012, until December 15, 2012. Season 3 of Welcome to Sweetie Pie's'' premiered on July 27, 2013, premiering with the highest-rated episode of the series' history. On April 14, 2018, OWN announced that the series will end after the ninth season. The ninth and final season premiered on May 1, 2018.

On March 14, 2016, frequent cast member Andre Montgomery Jr. was murdered in a St. Louis shooting. Andre Jr. was Robbie Montgomery's grandson and was the subject of numerous episodes which focused on his move from Texas to the St. Louis area, struggles in school, as well as a visit to the grave of his father Andre Montgomery Sr.  On August 18, 2020, Montgomery's son Tim Norman, who was also a frequent cast member, was arrested in Mississippi and charged for his alleged role in a murder for hire plot that resulted in the death of Montgomery's grandson in 2016. It was reported that Tim, who had been facing federal charges and was proven to have become the sole beneficiary to Andre Jr.'s estate in 2014, recruited an exotic dancer from Memphis named Terica Ellis and others to assist in the murder plot. In 2022, Ellis and two other co-conspirators would plead guilty to conspiracy to commit murder.  Norman's murder trial began on September 6, 2022, and on September 16 a jury convicted Norman on two counts of murder-for-hire and one charge of conspiracy to commit wire fraud. On March 2, 2023, Norman received a life sentence.

Episodes

Season 1 (2011–12)

Season 2 (2012)

Season 3 (2013)

Season 4 (2014)

Season 5 (2015)

Season 6 (2015–16)

Season 7 (2016–17)

Season 8 (2017–18)

Season 9 (2018)

Specials

Awards and nominations

References

External links
 
 
 

2010s American reality television series
2011 American television series debuts
2018 American television series endings
Oprah Winfrey Network original programming
African-American reality television series
English-language television shows